Alyson Shotz (born 1964) is an American sculptor based in Brooklyn, New York. She is best known for experiential, large-scale abstract sculptures and installations inspired by nature and scientific concepts, which manipulate light, shadow, space and gravity in order to investigate and complicate perception. Writers suggest her work challenges tenets of monumental, minimalist sculpture—traditionally welded, solid, heavy and static—through its accumulation of common materials in constructions that are often flexible, translucent, reflective, seemingly weightless, and responsive to changing conditions and basic forces.<ref name="Chavez08">Chávez, Anja. A Conversation with Alyson Shotz," Sculpture, November 2008.</ref> Sculpture critic Lilly Wei wrote, "In Shotz’s realizations, the definition of sculpture becomes increasingly expansive—each project, often in series, testing another proposition, another possibility, another permutation, while ignoring conventional boundaries." 

Shotz’s artwork has been loosely grouped into three types: expansive, generally large-scale sculptures and installations that are intricate and handmade; more minimal, self-contained sculptures that sometimes involve fabrication and elements of chance; and abstract photographs and digital prints based on photographs.Genocchio, Benjamin. "Quiet Dazzle and Chaotic Chimes," The New York Times, March 6, 2005. Retrieved July 7, 2022. It belongs to the public collections of the Museum of Modern Art, Whitney Museum, Museum of Fine Arts, Houston, and Guggenheim Museum Bilbao, among others. She has exhibited at venues including the Solomon R. Guggenheim Museum, Hirshhorn Museum and Sculpture Garden, San Francisco Museum of Modern Art (SFMOMA), Guggenheim Bilbao, Wexner Center for the Arts, and Indianapolis Museum of Art.

Education and early and career
Shotz was born in Glendale, Arizona in 1964, the daughter of an Air Force pilot and a teacher. In her childhood, she lived throughout the West and Midwest due to her father's career. She initially studied geology, but gradually turned to art; science has remained a strong influence on her work. After enrolling at Rhode Island School of Design, she graduated with a BFA in 1987 and earned an MFA from the University of Washington in 1991. In the early 1990s, she moved to New York City.

Early in her career, Shotz worked as a painter, producing colorful images of organic forms, while sometimes integrating photography, collage and video into her practice. A foundational work was Reflective Mimicry (1996), which included photographs and a video of a woman walking in the woods, clad in a full-body suit armored in small mirrors; its play of reflected foliage against actual foliage had the effect of de-materializing the figure. She would continue to explore this blurring of figure and ground in later work, most similarly, in large-scale outdoor installations such as Mirror Fence (2003) and Scattering Screen (2016).

Work and reception
Shotz's sculptures and installations manipulate ordinary synthetic materials—optical lenses, mirrors, glass, piano strings, wire, beads, nails—in concert with physical forces (space, light, gravity and matter) in order to investigate the shaping of perception, experiential boundaries, and ephemeral phenomena.Helmke, Juliet. "The Transmuting Sculptures of Alyson Shotz," Blouin ArtInfo, February 21, 2017. Her work combines craftsmanship and process-intensive methods of accumulation and structure-building, often based in underlying concepts from physics, optics and mathematics.Rushworth, Katherine. "Space, Light and Life," The Post-Standard, November 29, 2009. The resulting works produce perceptual conundrums—visual flux, spatial distortion, kaleidoscopic effects, and illusions of movement that result from shifts in light and vantage point.Johnson, Ken. "Alyson Shotz," The New York Times, April 8, 2005. Retrieved July 7, 2022.Brundage, Brita. "Reflections/Deceptions," Fairfield Weekly, March 10, 2005. They evoke both natural sensations and scientific models, while blurring the ability to distinguish human-made from organic materials.

 
Critics suggest that her work recalls minimalist constructions (e.g., Richard Serra), but stretches the boundaries of modernist sculpture, subverting ostensibly masculine tenets such as solidity, weight and fixity with qualities of fluidity, weightlessness, permeability and translucency; along these lines, one of Shotz's stated aims is to create volume without mass through her use of line, void, and carefully selected materials.Glasstire. "Nasher Sculpture Center, Sightings: Alyson Shotz," September 2010. Retrieved July 10, 2022. The blend of minimal and organic forms in her art has been compared to that of Eva Hesse, however, she differs in her interest in the viewer as a participant; that emphasis has been related to the conceptual work of Lygia Clark, though Shotz's entails a more optical than physical participation.

Works and exhibitions, 1999–2009
Beginning in the late 1990s, Shotz began receiving critical attention for work that The New Yorker deemed "a cyberorganic spin on landscape," which she exhibited at venues including the Aldrich Museum of Contemporary Art, MoMA PS1 and MASS MoCA.Mass MoCA. "Mirror Mirror," Events. Retrieved July 10, 2022. The New Art Examiner described her solo exhibition at Susan Inglett (1999) as displaying a "fascination with nature that's part childlike wonder, part humorous romp, and part clinical investigation." It included a digital photo of collaged budding flowers suggesting genetic engineering, a video, and Pink Swarm, one of two shimmering, suspended topiary- or cloud-like sculptures made of plastic, wire and clear surgical tubing. Covered with hundreds of tiny petals that dripped strings of goo, the sculptures evoked natural processes gone to excess. 

For the Whitney Museum show "Pastoral Pop" (2000), Shotz installed Mobile Flora, a grove of 9-foot-tall, slender stalks made of Q-tips coated in green rubber with casters replacing roots, that reviews characterized as "weird, plant-machine hybrids," "alien bamboo," and "genetically mutated lily pads and beanstalks." In 2003, she created "Mirror Fence" at the Socrates Sculpture Park, a shimmering, three-by-130-foot-long picket fence faced in mirrors, whose slats disappeared and reappeared amid the surrounding landscape as viewers approached.Pratt, Kevin. "Yard," Artforum, September 2003. Retrieved July 7, 2022.
 
In subsequent exhibitions, Shotz presented abstract sculptures characterized as updated postminimalism "with a dash of pop science." These works consisted of accumulations of common materials that hung like drawings in space, evoking natural phenomena, invisible dimensions, and theoretical concepts such as string theory and dark matter. The Shape of Space (2004)—exhibited in several galleries and museums—is representative of this period. It was an expansive, undulating, translucent curtain-like form whose thousands of hand-cut and stapled plastic lenses bent and refracted light, distorting and fragmenting space and creating confounding kaleidoscopic optical effects. Its fluctuating appearance was likened to a shimmering waterfall, a wall of ice, frosted translucent glass bricks, and—in its Guggenheim Museum presentation (2007), by Roberta Smith—to a "giant wind chime … dividing and multiplying its surroundings [to] provide tiny, glimmering, beveled views of the museum's rings, Central Park, an apartment building, traffic." Sculpture critic Jonathan Goodman wrote that this work was "about the fragile nature of perception … fields of being captured in mid-moment" that expand "awareness of the time-based nature of space." 

In shows at Locks Gallery, SFMOMA (both 2008), Derek Eller and Warehouse Gallery (both 2009), Shotz exhibited related suspended and wall-based sculptures that resembled ghostly, floating chandeliers or iced-over molecular forms (Crystalline Structure, 2007); weightless, skeletal apparitions made of long, bowing strands of beaded piano wire (The Structure of Light, 2008; Equilibrium, 2009); and billowing webs created by looping thread around pins nailed to walls in complex, mathematically based networks of triangles ("Thread Drawings", 2008). During this period, she also produced collage-like digital prints sourced from photographs of her own work (e.g., the series "A Momentary Configuration of Matter"). Reviews described them as hybrid, hive-like organic structures resembling DNA strands from an artificial life form, Rorschach tests, butterflies, lace patterns and skulls.

Installations and exhibitions, 2010– 
In later work, Shotz continued to explore large-scale sculptures and perceptual concerns while also pursuing a wider range of materials, forms and processes.Boucher, Brian. "Alyson Shotz at Carolina Nitsch," Art in America, October 2014. "Standing Wave" (2010, Wexner Center for the Arts) consisted of thousands of thin, iridescent clear acrylic strips placed side by side and projecting from a 25-foot-long wall in curved arches and undulating waves, whose shifting refractions and reflections were likened to op-art constructions. Wave Equation (2010, Nasher Sculpture Center) and Invariant Interval (2013, University of Texas) were monumental, yet light and delicate constructions employing piano and steel wire filaments in skeletal ellipses or web-like forms; reviews described them as "gossamer" works that moved between presence and absence, interior and exterior, and static mass and illusory motion. The installations Plane Weave (2016, Pennsylvania Academy of Fine Art) and Object for Reflection (2017/2020, Guggenheim Bilbao) were vertical, tapestry-like works made of thousands of octagonal pieces of perforated aluminum joined by steel rings, whose flexible, open construction allowed them to dramatically slump and fold and appear both solid and transparent. Their shimmering responses to changing sunlight evoked patterns ranging from natural (the sun on rippling water) to human-made (fabric, chain mail) to digital (screen pixels).Pennsylvania Academy of the Fine Arts. Alyson Shotz: Plane Weave, Exhibitions. Retrieved July 7, 2022.

In exhibitions at Carolina Nitsch (2014), the Wellin Museum (2015) and Derek Eller (2017, 2020), Shotz presented new bodies of work, often relying on chance. "Topographic Iterations" were abstract photo-drawings with a mystifying trompe l'oeil effect resembling cracked-earth interplanetary surfaces. She created them created by crumpling Japanese Masa paper, photographing and printing it, then crumpling the print. The "Recumbent Folds" series (2012–4) consisted of white, soft-sculpture-like porcelain forms created by dropping slabs or cylinders of clay from various heights and leaving them to harden. Her "Crushed Cubes" (2018) involved a similar approach, in this case crushing steel, copper or bronze cubes to form new, unpredictably organic objects that also reimagined conventional minimalist objects. The Imaginary Sculptures series (2014) eschewed materials altogether by simply visualizing possible sculptures with haiku-like imperatives inscribed on enameled wall plaques. 

In 2020, she exhibited the "Intricate Metamorphosis" works—intimate, corporeal ceiling-hung sculptures with iridescent, chain-mail-like surfaces made of small electroplated steel disks—and "Chronometer" series, which comprised rhythmic, wall-mounted abstractions like paintings composed of thousands of gleaming copper washers and nails, interrupted by snaking bands of recycled rubber bicycle inner tubes. New Yorker critic Johanna Fateman likened the former to "empty cocoons of some unknown species or, more fantastically, tails abandoned by mermaids," while suggesting the latter works embodied COVID-related themes of marking time and confronting mortality.
  
Recognition
Shotz's work belongs to the public collections of the Baltimore Museum of Art, Brooklyn Museum of Art, Solomon R. Guggenheim Museum, Guggenheim Bilbao, Hirshhorn Museum and Sculpture Garden, Indianapolis Museum of Art, Los Angeles County Museum of Art, Madison Museum of Contemporary Art, Museum of Fine Arts, Houston, Museum of Modern Art, National Gallery of Art, Pennsylvania Academy of the Fine Arts, The Phillips Collection, Rose Art Museum, San Francisco Museum of Modern Art, San Jose Museum of Art, Storm King Art CenterStorm King Art Center. Alyson Shotz, Collection. Retrieved July 10, 2022. and Whitney Museum, among others.Crystal Bridges Museum of American Art. "ArtistatCB: Alyson Shotz." Retrieved July 10, 2022.

She has been has commissioned to create several large-scale, site-specific works, including pieces for the High Museum of Art, Cleveland Clinic, MTA Arts & Design (New York), AT&T Stadium (Dallas), Stanford University Li Ka Shing Center for Learning and Knowledge, and U.S. General Services Administration. Shotz has been awarded fellowships from the Saint-Gaudens Memorial, New York Foundation for the Arts, MacDowell and Stanford University, and received awards from the Pollock-Krasner, Peter S. Reed, and Marie Walsh Sharpe foundations, Yale University and Art Matters, among others.Yale University. "Gallery's new artist-in-residence aims to connect viewers with nature," Yale Bulletin & Calendar, December 2, 2005. Retrieved July 10, 2022.

References

Further reading
 Ciraqui, Manuel and Sara Nadal-Melsió, (2017). Art and Space. Guggenheim Bilbao, Bilbao, Spain.
 Adler, Tracy L.; Veronica Roberts; Nat Trotman, (2015). Alyson Shotz: Force of Nature. The Ruth and Elmer Wellin Museum of Art, Hamilton College.  
 Al-Hadid, Diana; Lisa Freiman; Alison Gass; Jennifer Gross; Josiah McElheny; Jed Morse; David Norr; Carrie Mae Weems, (2014). Alyson Shotz. Derek Eller Gallery. .

External links
Alyson Shotz website
Alyson Shotz video studio visit Sculpture'', 2019]
In conversation with Alyson Shotz, The Phillips Collection, 2020
A conversation with Alyson Shotz, Guggenheim Bilbao
Alyson Shotz and curator Anne Ellegood, Hirshhorn Museum, 2008
Alyson Shotz, Derek Eller Gallery 
Alyson Shotz, GSA Gallery

Living people
University of Washington alumni
Rhode Island School of Design alumni
20th-century American sculptors
21st-century American sculptors
American women sculptors
20th-century American women artists
21st-century American women artists
1964 births